Scott Matthew McPhee,  (born 2 January 1992) is an Australian cyclist, who piloted Kieran Modra in tandem cycling. He won a gold medal with Modra at the 2012 London Paralympics.

Personal
McPhee was born in Adelaide on 2 January 1992. , he lives in the Adelaide suburb of Wayville where he is a student at the University of Adelaide working on a Bachelor of Law. He attended West Lakes Shore Primary School and completed high school at Prince Alfred College.

Cycling
In 2010, McPhee competed in the Rendition Homes Teams Series as a member of the South Australian Institute of Sport team. He won the Green Sprinters Jersey in the same event in 2011 riding for Team Bike Station Watermark and again in 2013 riding for Team Mcniell Logistics.

McPhee served as sighted pilot for visually impaired athlete Kieran Modra in tandem racing. At the 2011 Paracycling Track World Championships in Montichiari Italy the pair won the 4 km tandem pursuit in world record time. Throughout the year the pair had numerous results in Europe on the track and road including a bronze in the Segovia, Spain World cup road time trial.  He also piloted for Modra at the 2011 UCI Para-cycling Road World Championships in Copenhagen however as favourites for the road time trial the pair returned home early when Kieran suffered a broken collarbone in a training accident prior to the event.

McPhee partnered with Bryce Lindores at the 2012 Paracycling Track World Championships. Modra had suffered severe injuries in late 2011 preventing him from competing at the titles; McPhee was asked to aid by piloting Lindores whose regular pilot was unavailable for the competition. The pair won the 4 km tandem pursuit defending back to back titles for Scott and securing Bryce's first title. Leading into the 2012 London Paralympics, McPhee was an integral part of Modra's rehabilitation back onto the bike in a bid to have him ready to compete. At the Games, he won a gold medal in the Men's 4 km Tandem Pursuit with Modra and secured a new world record time for the event. Following the Games Scott retired from tandem cycling and returned to able bodied single bike racing. In 2013 Scott rode for Euride Racing in the Australian National Road Series.
Scott has raced for Cycling Team Tomacc based in Poperinge, Belgium for the 2014/2015 seasons.

Recognition
McPhee was awarded an Order of Australia Medal in the 2014 Australia Day Honours "for service to sport as a Gold Medallist at the London 2012 Paralympic Games."

References

External links

 

1992 births
Living people
Australian male cyclists
Paralympic sighted guides
Paralympic cyclists of Australia
Paralympic gold medalists for Australia
Paralympic medalists in cycling
Cyclists at the 2012 Summer Paralympics
Medalists at the 2012 Summer Paralympics
Recipients of the Medal of the Order of Australia
Cyclists from Adelaide
South Australian Sports Institute alumni